Cleaveius is a genus of worms belonging to the family Rhadinorhynchidae.

The species of this genus are found in Indian Ocean.

Species:

Cleaveius circumspinifer 
Cleaveius clupei 
Cleaveius durdanae 
Cleaveius fotedari 
Cleaveius inglisi 
Cleaveius leiognathi 
Cleaveius longirostris 
Cleaveius mysti 
Cleaveius portblairensis 
Cleaveius prashadi 
Cleaveius puriensis 
Cleaveius secundus 
Cleaveius singhai 
Cleaveius thapari

References

Acanthocephalans